The first Battle of Verdun was fought between 29 August and 2 September 1792 between French Revolutionary forces and a Prussian army during the opening months of the War of the First Coalition. The Prussians were victorious, gaining a clear westward path to Paris.

Battle
Colonel Nicolas-Joseph Beaurepaire, who had commanded the defense of Verdun, chose death by suicide to avoid the dishonor of surrendering Verdun.

See also
 Battle of Valmy on 20 September 1792
 Siege of Verdun (1870) in the Franco-Prussian War
 Battle of Verdun (1916) in World War I

Notes

References

External links

Battles involving Prussia
Conflicts in 1792
1792 in France
Battles of the War of the First Coalition
Battles in Grand Est
History of Meuse (department)